The drug combination aliskiren/amlodipine (INNs, trade names Tekamlo and Rasilamlo) is an antihypertensive. Clinical trials have shown it to be more effective than amlodipine on its own, with a high dosing regime (aliskiren 300 mg/amlodipine 10 mg) being more effective than olmesartan/amlodipine with comparable tolerability.

References

Further reading

External links 
 

Combination drugs
Novartis brands